The 1878–79 Scottish Cup – officially the Scottish Football Association Challenge Cup – was the sixth season of Scotland's most prestigious football knockout competition. Defending champions Vale of Leven met Rangers in the final but, after a 1–1 draw in the original match on 19 April 1879, the replay was scratched and Vale of Leven were awarded the cup. Rangers objected to a goal being disallowed in the original match and refused to play the replay.

This was the second consecutive season that more than 100 teams entered the competition with a record 125 clubs competing after Pollokshaws Athletic withdrew before the competition began.

Format

As with the previous competitions, the sixth edition of the Scottish Cup took on the format of a traditional knockout tournament. For the earlier rounds, the names of competing teams were placed into lots according to their districts and drawn into pairs. The home team for each tie was determined by the toss of a coin unless it was mutually agreed or only one of the two clubs drawn against one another had a private ground. In the event of a draw, the team who lost the toss would have the choice of ground for the replay. A similar procedure was used for subsequent rounds however, any club which had received a bye in the previous round would first be drawn against one of the winners of the previous round. The names of winning teams were placed into one lot for later rounds. The choice of venue for the final matches was reserved to the Scottish Football Association.

Calendar
The exact dates of some matches are unknown as newspaper coverage of football in the late 19th century was not as comprehensive as it would become.

Both Glasgow and Edinburgh University were given byes to the third round.
Clydesdale and Dennistoun were both disqualified from the competition without playing their first round tie.
Six teams qualified for the second round after drawing their first round replay.
Glengowan and Airdrie were both disqualified from the competition after their second round tie.
Both Partick and Stonelaw were reinstated in the fifth round after Thistle were disqualified.

Teams
All 126 teams entered the competition in the first round.

First round
In total, there were 59 first round ties after five teams received a bye to the second round, Pollokshaws Athletic disbanded before the competition began and Glasgow University and Edinburgh University received a bye to the third round. However, only 51 ties were played after Girvan, Blythswood, Stranraer, Maybole Carrick, Star of Leven, 4th Renfrew RV and Govanhill Lacrosse scratched to Catrine, Clyde, Cree Rovers, Mauchline, Renton, Stonefield and Wellpark respectively. Dennistoun were drawn to play Clydesdale but both teams scratched and were eliminated from the competition.

Two-time defending champions Vale of Leven began the competition with a 6–0 home win against Alclutha from Dumbarton on 21 September 1878. On the same day, Queen's Park – who were looking to regain the trophy they had last won in 1876 – had a similarly convincing win as they saw off Kelvinbank 8–0. Rangers defeated Shaftesbury 3–0 at Kinning Park a week later while there were big wins for Kilmarnock Portland (9–0 vs. Dean), Upper Clydesdale (12–0 vs. Newmains) and Whitefield (10–0 vs. Telegraphists).

Matches

Dumfriesshire district

Wigtownshire district

Ayrshire district

Glasgow and Suburbs
Burnside received a bye to the second round and Glasgow University to the third round.

Edinburgh district
Edinburgh University received a bye to the third round.

Dunbartonshire district

Lanarkshire district
Clarkston received a bye to the second round.

Renfrewshire district

Stirlingshire district
Shaugraun received a bye to the second round.

Forfarshire district
St Clement's received a bye to the second round.

Perthshire district

Replays

Ayrshire district

Glasgow and Suburbs

Dunbartonshire district

Lanarkshire district

Renfrewshire district

Notes

Sources:

Second round
The second round began on 12 October 1878 with Govan's 2–1 over Oxford. Most of the ties were played a week later. Queen's Park defeated Pollokshields Athletic 6–0 at Lorne Park while Rangers won 6–1 at home to Whitefield. Vale of Leven recorded the biggest win of the round as they thumped Renton Thistle 11–0 at North Street Park on 26 October.

With an even number of teams in the draw, no byes were awarded but not every team would play a match. St Clement's scratched from their tie with Arbroath before Shotts scratched from their replay with Clarkston after the teams had drawn 1–1 on 19 October. Glengowan defeated Airdrie 2–0 away from home but neither side advanced as both were disqualified and, despite losing 5–0 to South Western, a protest from Petershill was upheld and a replay was ordered. South Western also won the replay 8–0.

Matches

Glasgow and Suburbs
Glasgow University received a bye to the third round.

Ayrshire district

Renfrewshire district

Lanarkshire district

Edinburgh district
Edinburgh University received a bye to the third round.

Dunbartonshire district

Stirlingshire district

Forfarshire district

Perthshire district

Wigtownshire and Dumfriesshire districts

Replays

Glasgow and Suburbs

Lanarkshire district

Notes

Sources:

Third round
Two teams received a bye to the fourth round while Glasgow University scratched from their tie with Queen's Park. The third round began on 2 November 1878 as 3rd Lanark RV defeated South Western 2–1 at Cathkin Park. A week later, free-scoring Vale of Leven took their tally for the competition to 32 goals after a thumping 15–0 win over Jamestown at North Street Park setting a new Scottish Cup record for the biggest margin of victory in the process. Rangers defeated Parkgrove 8–2 while Beith recorded a 7–1 triumph over Barrhead.

Although Thistle defeated Partick 2–1 on 16 November and did play in and win their fourth round tie, they were later disqualified from the competition with Partick reinstated in the fifth round.

Matches

Glasgow and Suburbs

Ayrshire, Dumfriesshire and Renfrewshire districts
Renfrew received a bye to the fourth round.

Lanarkshire, Dunbartonshire, Stirlingshire and Perthshire districts
Rob Roy received a bye to the fourth round.

Edinburgh and Forfarshire districts

Sources:

Fourth round
Most fourth round ties were played on 30 November 1878 and, with an even number of teams, there were no byes awarded. Vale of Leven continued their fine form, recording a third consecutive double-figures win, as they defeated Govan 11–1 conceding a goal for the first time in the process. Beith were the last Ayrshire team standing after thumping Kilmarnock Athletic 9–1 while Mauchline lost 5–0 to Queen's Park and Kilmarnock Portland lost 6–1 in a replay to Dumbarton. Similarly, Hibernian became the last Edinburgh club standing after thumping Rob Roy 9–0 while Heart of Midlothian lost 2–1 to Helensburgh. Rangers defeated Alexandra Athletic 3–0.

Thistle, who had defeated Partick in the previous round, were disqualified from the competition following their 2–0 win over Stonelaw and both Partick and Stonelaw were reinstated.

Matches

Replay

Notes

Sources:

Fifth round
All five fifth round matches were played on 8 March 1879. Dumbarton reached the quarter-finals for the first time in three seasons with a 9–1 win at home to Stonelaw while fellow Dunbartonshire club Helensburgh defeated the last remaining Edinburgh side, Hibernian, 2–1 away from home. Queen's Park played 3rd Lanark RV in a replay of the 1876 final at Hampden Park and they eased through with a 5–0 win while Rangers defeated Partick 4–0. Holders Vale of Leven defeated Beith 6–1 at North Street Park.

Matches

Sources:

Quarter-finals
With just five teams left, there were only two quarter-final ties and Helensburgh received a bye to the semi-finals. Both games were played on 22 March 1879. Queen's Park's quest to regain the trophy was ended by Glasgow rivals Rangers as Dunlop scored the only of the game at Hampden Park to see them through to the semi-finals. They were joined by Vale of Leven as the defending champions eased passed Dunbartonshire rivals Dumbarton with a 3–1 win at North Street Park.

Matches

Sources:

Semi-final
For the third consecutive season, there was just one semi-final played and Rangers, for the second time, received a bye to the final. Helensburgh hosted Dunbartonshire rivals Vale of Leven but they were no match for a Vale side targeting a third consecutive title as they succumbed to a 3–0 loss at Kirkmichael Park.

Matches

Sources:

Final

Hampden Park in Glasgow again played host to the Scottish Cup final as Vale of Leven faced Rangers in a rematch of the 1877 final on 19 April 1879. That tie took three matches to decided and it initially looked like this year's final would be no different after goals from Struthers and Ferguson saw the teams draw 1–1 in front of 6,000 spectators. However, Rangers had been incensed by the referee's decision to disallow a goal and refused to play the replay, scheduled for 26 April. As a result, Vale of Leven were awarded the trophy, their third success in three years.

Original match

Replay

See also
1878–79 in Scottish football

References

1878-79
Cup
Scot